HT Bandy was a Swedish-Finnish bandy club. The club was located to Haparanda in Sweden and Tornio in Finland, two towns on each side of the Swedish-Finnish border. It was founded on 22 July 2008 when the two clubs in the towns decided to merge formally, after having had a deep cooperation for many years.

HaparandaTornio played in Elitserien, the top-tier of Swedish bandy, in the 2009–10 and 2010–11 seasons, but has since been playing in the second-level league, Allsvenskan.

On 9 March 2017, HaparandaTornio BF folded.

References

External links

Bandy clubs in Sweden
Bandy clubs in Finland
Bandy clubs established in 2008
2008 establishments in Sweden
2008 establishments in Finland
Sport in Norrbotten County